"Aimer jusqu'à l'impossible" (2005) is the first single from Australian singer Tina Arena's fifth studio album and its title roughly translates as "Love till the impossible" in English. The single was Tina's biggest hit in France to date.

After debuting at number 3 on the French national chart, it remained in the top five for 12 weeks and was certified platinum in February 2006. As of August 2014, it was the 68th best-selling single of the 21st century in France, with 354,000 units sold.

The video for the song was shot in Paris at a variety of different locations including the Champs-Élysées. It was directed by Thierry Vergnes.

She performed this song at 2006 NRJ Music Awards with six other female Francophone singers—Anggun, Natasha St-Pier, Amel Bent, Nâdiya, Lââm and Leslie.

Track listings
"Aimer jusqu'à l'impossible" (David Gategno, Elodie Hesme) – 3:24
"Aller plus haut" (version 500 choristes) (J. Kapler) – 3:56 
"Simple désir" (Tina Arena, Lucy Harrison) – 2:51

Charts

Weekly charts

Year-end charts

Certifications

References

2005 singles
Tina Arena songs
French-language songs
French pop songs
Ultratop 50 Singles (Wallonia) number-one singles
2005 songs
Columbia Records singles